Gyrostemon is a genus of shrubs or small trees in the family Gyrostemonaceae, endemic to  Australia.

Species include:

Gyrostemon australasicus  (Moq.) Heimerl – Camel Poison 
Gyrostemon brownii S.Moore
Gyrostemon ditrigynus A.S.George
Gyrostemon osmus Halford  
Gyrostemon prostratus A.S.George  
Gyrostemon racemiger H.Walter 
Gyrostemon ramulosus Desf. – Corkybark  
Gyrostemon reticulatus A.S.George
Gyrostemon sessilis A.S.George
Gyrostemon sheathii W.Fitzg. 
Gyrostemon subnudus (Nees) Baill.
Gyrostemon tepperi (F.Muell. ex H.Walter) A.S.George 
Gyrostemon thesioides (Hook.f.) A.S.George

References

Brassicales genera
Gyrostemonaceae
Rosids of Australia
Taxa named by René Louiche Desfontaines